Frank Christian (October 23, 1910 — December 8, 1969)  was a NASCAR race car owner who owned a series of stock car vehicles from 1949 to 1955. Christian finished sixth in his only NASCAR race start (1949-03).

He was also the husband of former NASCAR Grand National Series driver Sara Christian in addition to being a businessman and a provider of illegal alcoholic beverages. During his adult life, he resided in Atlanta, Georgia where he would base his legitimate businessman career from.

Career
As a pioneer in multi-car ownership, Christian would lead the way for the modern day "super teams" like Hendrick Motorsports.

He earned $81,285 in monetary prizes as an owner ($ when adjusted for inflation) in addition to winning 22 races. Notable drivers under his employment included: Speedy Thompson, Buddy Shuman, Banjo Matthews, Fonty Flock, Buck Baker, and Curtis Turner. Christian even did several races as a driver/owner; adding to the lap total of 21,804 that his vehicles did while under his ownership. Out of all these laps, only 5220 were by Mr. Christian's drivers.

However, his vehicles did do well in finishing races as the average starting position was sixth place and the average finishing position was twelfth place. Pole positions were plentiful for Frank Christian's vehicles as they managed to accumulate 35 pole positions within 6 years.

Motorsports career results

NASCAR
(key) (Bold – Pole position awarded by qualifying time. Italics – Pole position earned by points standings or practice time. * – Most laps led.)

Strictly Stock Series

References

External links
 
 

1910 births
1969 deaths
20th-century American businesspeople
Businesspeople from Georgia (U.S. state)
NASCAR team owners
People from Atlanta